John Powers Crowley (October 5, 1936 – January 10, 1989) was a United States district judge of the United States District Court for the Northern District of Illinois.

Education and career

Born in Chicago, Illinois, Crowley received a Bachelor of Laws from DePaul University College of Law in 1960 and a Master of Laws from New York University School of Law in 1961. He was an Assistant United States Attorney of the Northern District of Illinois from 1961 to 1965, and was thereafter in private practice in Chicago from 1965 to 1976.

Federal judicial service

On May 18, 1976, Crowley was nominated by President Gerald Ford to a seat on the United States District Court for the Northern District of Illinois vacated by Judge Richard B. Austin. Crowley was confirmed by the United States Senate on June 16, 1976, and received his commission the same day. Crowley served in that capacity until his resignation on June 30, 1981.

Post judicial service and death

After retiring from the federal bench, Crowley returned to the private practice of law. He was diagnosed with cancer in October 1987 and died on January 10, 1989, in Evanston, Illinois, remaining active in the practice of law until a few months before his death.

References

Sources
 

1936 births
1989 deaths
Assistant United States Attorneys
DePaul University College of Law alumni
Judges of the United States District Court for the Northern District of Illinois
New York University School of Law alumni
People from Chicago
United States district court judges appointed by Gerald Ford
20th-century American judges
20th-century American lawyers